Aleksey Fabry (ru)
 Valery Fadeev (ru)
 Aleksandr Fadin (ru)
 Anton Farelyuk (ru)
 Viktor Fedosov (ru)
 Yevgeny Fedotov (ru)
 Aleksandr Feklisov
 Nikolai Filin (ru)
 Roman Filipov
 Igor Filkin (ru)
 Sergey Firsov (ru)
 Ivan Flyorov
 Gennady Fomenko (ru)
 Aleksandr Fomin (ru)
 Aleksey Fomin (ru)
 Yevgeny Frolov (ru)

References 
 

Heroes F